The 2018 Monte Carlo Formula 2 round was a pair of motor races for Formula 2 cars that took place on 25 and 26 May 2018 at the Circuit de Monaco in Monte-Carlo, Monaco as part of the FIA Formula 2 Championship. It was the fourth round of the 2018 FIA Formula 2 Championship and ran in support of the 2018 Monaco Grand Prix.

Report

Qualifying 
For qualifying, the field was split into two groups due to the short nature of the circuit.

Classifications

Qualifying

Group A

 – Lando Norris was given a three-place grid drop due to found guilty of impeding Alexander Albon.
 – Maximilian Günther was disqualified as his car did not stop to be weighed during the session but allowed to start the Feature Race from pit lane.

Group B

 – Sérgio Sette Câmara had not give permission to start after suffering a hand injury from qualifying crash.

Feature Race 

 – Maximilian Günther set the fastest lap in the race but because he finished outside the top 10, the two bonus points for fastest lap went to Artem Markelov as he set the fastest lap inside the top 10 finishers.

Sprint Race 

 – Antonio Fuoco was added 0.8 seconds and Lando Norris was added 1.1 seconds for VSC infractions.
 – Roberto Merhi was handed a five-second time penalty for overtaking Arjun Maini under the Safety Car.
 – Santino Ferrucci was handed a ten-second time penalty for having carried out clutch bite point checks in the pitlane, failing to comply with instructions from the race director.
 – Alexander Albon was handed a five-place penalty for colliding with Nyck de Vries at pit entry in the Feature Race.
 — Santino Ferrucci and Nirei Fukuzumi were classified despite retiring as they have completed more than 90% of the race.

Championship standings after the round

Drivers' Championship standings

Teams' Championship standings

References

External links 
 

Monaco
Formula 2
Formula 2